Guido Maestri (born in Mudgee, New South Wales in 1974) is an Australian contemporary artist who won the 2009 Archibald Prize for a portrait of Australian singer and musician Geoffrey Gurrumul Yunupingu.

He completed a Bachelor of Fine Arts at the National Art School in Darlinghurst in 2003 and was a finalist in the 2007 and 2008 Dobell Drawing Prize. He was also an Archibald Prize finalist in 2016 and 2020.

He is represented by Jan Murphy Gallery (Brisbane) and Yavuz Gallery (Sydney and Singapore).

See also
List of Archibald Prize winners

References

                  

1974 births
Living people
Australian painters
People educated at Davidson High School
Archibald Prize winners
National Art School alumni
Archibald Prize finalists
Archibald Prize Salon des Refusés People's Choice Award winners